The 2015 Chinese Taipei Open Grand Prix Gold was the ninth grand prix gold and grand prix tournament of the 2015 BWF Grand Prix and Grand Prix Gold. The tournament was held in Taipei Arena, Taipei, Taiwan July 14–19, 2015 and had a total purse of $200,000.

Players by nation

Men's singles

Seeds

  Chen Long (champion)
  Jan Ø. Jørgensen (quarter-final)
  Srikanth Kidambi (second round)
  Lin Dan (semi-final)
  Chou Tien-chen (final)
  Wang Zhengming (third round)
  Son Wan-ho (second round)
  Tian Houwei (first round)
  Hu Yun (second round)
  Tommy Sugiarto (second round)
  Wei Nan (semi-final)
  Dionysius Hayom Rumbaka (third round)
  Tanongsak Saensomboonsuk (first round)
  Wong Wing Ki (second round)
  Hsu Jen-hao (third round)
  Takuma Ueda (first round)

Finals

Top half

Section 1

Section 2

Section 3

Section 4

Bottom half

Section 5

Section 6

Section 7

Section 8

Women's singles

Seeds

  Ratchanok Intanon (semi-final)
  Li Xuerui (final)
  Tai Tzu-ying (semi-final)
  Wang Shixian (quarter-final)
  Sung Ji-hyun (first round)
  Wang Yihan (champion)
  Akane Yamaguchi (withdrew)
  Nozomi Okuhara (quarter-final)

Finals

Top half

Section 1

Section 2

Bottom half

Section 3

Section 4

Men's doubles

Seeds

  Lee Yong-dae / Yoo Yeon-seong (semi-final)
  Chai Biao / Hong Wei (first round)
  Muhammad Ahsan / Hendra Setiawan (semi-final)
  Hiroyuki Endo / Kenichi Hayakawa (quarter-final)
  Fu Haifeng / Zhang Nan (champion)
  Lee Sheng-mu / Tsai Chia-hsin (first round)
  Ko Sung-hyun / Shin Baek-cheol (quarter-final)
  Kim Ki-jung / Kim Sa-rang (first round)

Finals

Top half

Section 1

Section 2

Bottom half

Section 3

Section 4

Women's doubles

Seeds

  Misaki Matsutomo / Ayaka Takahashi (semi-final)
  Luo Ying / Luo Yu (final)
  Christinna Pedersen / Kamilla Rytter Juhl (second round)
  Nitya Krishinda Maheswari / Greysia Polii (champion)
  Reika Kakiiwa / Miyuki Maeda (withdrew)
  Chang Ye-na / Jung Kyung-eun (quarter-final)
  Lee So-hee / Shin Seung-chan (first round)
  Vivian Hoo Kah Mun / Woon Khe Wei (second round)

Finals

Top half

Section 1

Section 2

Bottom half

Section 3

Section 4

Mixed doubles

Seeds

  Zhang Nan / Zhao Yunlei (quarter-final)
  Xu Chen / Ma Jin (second round)
  Liu Cheng / Bao Yixin (quarter-final)
  Joachim Fischer Nielsen / Christinna Pedersen (first round)
  Lu Kai / Huang Yaqiong (second round)
  Riky Widianto /  Richi Puspita Dili (quarter-final)
  Ko Sung-hyun / Kim Ha-na (champion)
  Praveen Jordan / Debby Susanto (semifinal)

Finals

Top half

Section 1

Section 2

Bottom half

Section 3

Section 4

References

Chinese Taipei Open
BWF Grand Prix Gold and Grand Prix
Chinese Taipei Open Grand Prix Gold
2015 in Taiwanese sport